The 2020 Georgia House of Representatives elections took place on November 3, 2020 as part of the biennial United States elections. Georgia voters elected state representatives in all 180 of the state house's districts to the 156th Georgia General Assembly. State representatives serve two-year terms in the Georgia House of Representatives.

Primaries were held on June 9, 2020, coinciding with primaries for U.S. President, U.S. Senate, U.S. House, Georgia House of Representatives, county and regional prosecutorial offices, and primary runoffs are scheduled for August 11, 2020, to determine which candidates will appear on the November 3 ballot.

To reclaim control of the chamber from Republicans, the Democrats needed to net 16 seats. Democrats filed candidacies for 141 total seats in the State House, the highest number of Democratic candidacies for State House since the 1990s.

Republicans retained control of the chamber with 103 seats, but suffered a net loss of 2 seats.

Predictions

Results

Closest races 
Seats where the margin of victory was under 10%:

Sources:

District 1

District 2

District 3

District 4

District 5

District 6

District 7

District 8

District 9

District 10

District 11

District 12

District 13

District 14

District 15

District 16

District 17

District 18

District 19

District 20

District 21

District 22

District 23

District 24

District 25

District 26

District 27

District 28

District 29

District 30

District 31

District 32

District 33

District 34

District 35

District 36

District 37

District 38

District 39

District 40

District 41

District 42

District 43

District 44

District 45

District 46

District 47

District 48

District 49

District 50

District 51

District 52

District 53

District 54

District 55

District 56

District 57

District 58

District 59

District 60

District 61

District 62

District 63

District 64

District 65

District 66

District 67

District 68

District 69

District 70

District 71

District 72

District 73

District 74

District 75

District 76

District 77

District 78

District 79

District 80

District 81

District 82

District 83

District 84

District 85

District 86

District 87

District 88

District 89

District 90

District 91

District 92

District 93

District 94

District 95

District 96

District 97

District 98

District 99

District 100

District 101

District 102

District 103

District 104

District 105

District 106

District 107

District 108

District 109

District 110

District 111

District 112

District 113

District 114

District 115

District 116

District 117

District 118

District 119

District 120

District 121

District 122

District 123

District 124

District 125

District 126

District 127

District 128

District 129

District 130

District 131

District 132

District 133

District 134

District 135

District 136

District 137

District 138

District 139

District 140

District 141

District 142

District 143

District 144

District 145

District 146

District 147

District 148

District 149

District 150

District 151

District 152

District 153

District 154

District 155

District 156

District 157

District 158

District 159

District 160

District 161

District 162

District 163

District 164

District 165

District 166

District 167

District 168

District 169

District 170

District 171

District 172

District 173

District 174

District 175

District 176

District 177

District 178

District 179

District 180

See also
 Voter suppression in the United States 2019–2020: Georgia
 2020 Georgia elections
 Elections in Georgia (U.S. state)

References

External links
 
  (State affiliate of the U.S. League of Women Voters)
Elections  at the Georgia Secretary of State official website

 
 
 

Georgia House of Representatives
Georgia House of Representatives elections
Georgia House